Pondok Pesantren Al Manshurin was established in response to the growing demands of citizens of the Indonesian Islamic Propagation Institute Metro Lampung and the needs of scholars who mastered the disciplines of the Koran and Hadith. Current students come from South Sumatra and as far away as East Java.

Students are required to live in lodgings or a hostel. The school's regimen is intended to familiarize the students with a disciplined and orderly life, as well as to help students apply their knowledge in everyday life via study of the Koran.

The Koran is presented as a guide to daily life in the curriculum, which includes interpreting the Koran and Hadith.

See also

 Indonesia Institute of Islamic Dawah

External links
 Official Website of LDII
 Informasi Tentang LDII
 Nuansa Persada
 LDII Jatim
 LDII Surabaya
 LDII Sidoarjo
 Pusat Ilmu Islam

Metro (city)
Pesantren in Indonesia